Silverdawn is a fantasy role-playing play-by-mail game (PBM). The human-moderated, open-ended game was designed by Jim Dutton and published by Entertainment Concepts, Inc. in 1981. Players selected characters with classes such as cleric, fighter, ranger, thief, along with races and various attributes. Additional starting variables included spells and weapons. Diplomacy was not part of Silverdawn, gameplay was solo without interaction with other players. The setting was the world of Nyarna. The game's flexible narrative gaming system allowed players to choose good or evil paths. Silverdawn received two generally positive reviews in the early 1980s with one reviewer noting some drawbacks to the game.

History and development
Jim Dutton designed Silverdawn. Entertainment Concepts, Inc. began advertising Silverdawn in July 1981 and gameplay started four months later. Silverdawn was the company's first game (followed by Star Trek, the Correspondence Adventure in October 1982). In 1985, costs for a single character setup were $5.00 with $3.00 per turn. The game was human-moderated and open-ended.

Gameplay
A notable aspect of Silverdawn was its solo-play; players played the entire game alone. For their character, players could select a male or female from four classes: cleric, fighter, ranger, and thief, from different races (including one called Haffers, apparently a cross between a human and halfling) and with various attributes. Magic users of four types were also available and part of game setup involved selecting spells and weapons.

The setting is the world of Nyarna. Players began in Valapar, "capital city of the Golden Empire". Although the game system assumed players will be "champions of Good", the flexible order sheet enabled players to pursue the opposite, which some players did. Players submitted up to three pages of text per turn to the gamemaster and received a turn result as 1–3 pages of narrative prose describing the result with Gamemaster Notes for attribute changes and other communications.

Reception
W.G. Armintrout reviewed the game in the October–November 1983 issue of Fantasy Gamer. He concluded that the game is "the best commercial RPG in the play-by-mail field that I'm aware of. The game works smoothly. The adventures are fun. The game mastering is fair. ECI is reliable and dependable. I had fun with the game. I recommend it". John W. Kelley Jr. reviewed Silverdawn in the January–February 1985 issue of Paper Mayhem. He stated that the personally-written turn translated to significant work for a reasonable price, noting that the game was "broad in scope, flexible to the whims of individual players, and about as realistic as fantasy is supposed to get". He found fault in a tendency of the company to keep characters alive, even after a lethal adventuring event. He also noted the relatively longer turnaround times for turns and waning newsletter with turns, for example, resulting from the publisher's success and expansion, which detracted from the excitement of the game. He summarized that, "All problems aside, though, Silverdawn is a game worth playing at least once."

See also
 List of play-by-mail games

References

Bibliography

 
 
 
 
 

Multiplayer games
Play-by-mail games